Louis Adolphe Octave Gallice (8 October 1857 – 18 June 1906) was a French champagne wine merchant and equestrian.

Personal life
Gallice was born in Épernay on 8 October 1857, the son of Eugène Gallice (1828–1872) and Adeline Purnot. He had three brothers and a sister. He married Blanche Elisa Victorine Mauger in 1892; the couple had no children.

Gallice died in Paris on 18 June 1906.

Business interests
In 1958, Gallice's father had become a partner in Perrier-Jouët with his brother-in-law Charles Perrier. Following the death of Perrier in 1878, Gallice and his brother, Henri, inherited the company, with Henri taking over the running of the business. The brothers also founded Gallice et Compagnie.

Equestrian
Gallice competed in the mail coach event at the 1900 Summer Olympics.

References

External links
 

1857 births
1906 deaths
French winemakers
French male equestrians
Olympic equestrians of France
Equestrians at the 1900 Summer Olympics
People from Épernay